Farigliano is a comune (municipality) in the Province of Cuneo in the Italian region Piedmont, located about  southeast of Turin and about  northeast of Cuneo.

Farigliano borders the following municipalities: Belvedere Langhe, Carrù, Clavesana, Dogliani, Lequio Tanaro, and Piozzo.

Farigliano is also the birthplace of Pietro Ferrero, Italian chocolatier and the founder of Ferrero SpA.

Demographic evolution

Twin towns — sister cities
Farigliano is twinned with:

  Pianezze, Italy (1998)

References

External links
 www.comune.farigliano.cn.it